"Imprudence" is a short story by French author Guy de Maupassant, published in 1885.

History
Signed under the name "Maufrigneuse", Imprudence is a short story written by Guy de Maupassant. It was first published in the newspaper Gil Blas on September 15, 1885, before being reprised in the Monsieur Parent collection.

Synopsis
Henriette and Paul are becoming bored of each other after their marriage. Henriette asks Paul to take her to a cabaret where they can have a date...

Publications
 Gil Blas, 1885
 Monsieur Parent - collection published in 1885 by the editor Paul Ollendorff
 Maupassant, contes et nouvelles, volume II, text established and annotated by Louis Forestier, Bibliothèque de la Pléiade, Éditions Gallimard, 1979

References

1885 short stories
Short stories by Guy de Maupassant
Works originally published in Gil Blas (periodical)